Domińczyk/ Dominczyk/ Dominchyk/ Dominchuk is a Polish surname. Notable people with the name include:

 Dagmara Domińczyk (born 1976), Polish-born American actress
 John Dominczyk, character from 2014 crime drama film A Most Violent Year
 Marika Domińczyk (born 1980), Polish-born American actress
  (born 1953), Polish Solidarity activist
 Veronika Domińczyk (born 1986), Polish-American actress and sister of Dagmara Domińczyk

Polish-language surnames